Fausto Frigerio (born 13 February 1966 in Vimercate) is a retired Italian hurdler and long jumper.

Biography
He won the bronze medals at the 1985 European Athletics Junior Championships behind Jon Ridgeon and Colin Jackson and at the 1991 Mediterranean Games. At the 1991 Mediterranean Games he also won the silver medal in long jump. He participated at the World Championships in 1991 (long jump) and 1993 (hurdles) without reaching the final.

His personal best time is 13.64 seconds, achieved in July 1993 in Sestriere. The Italian record currently belongs to Emanuele Abate with 13.28 seconds. His personal best long jump was 8.15 metres, achieved in July 1990 in Cagliari.

National titles
He has won 4 times the individual national championship.
2 wins in the 110 metres hurdles (1989, 1993)
1 win in the long jump (1991)
1 win in the long jump indoor (1993)

See also
 Italian all-time top lists - Long jump

References

External links
 

1966 births
Living people
People from Vimercate
Italian male hurdlers
Italian male long jumpers
World Athletics Championships athletes for Italy
Mediterranean Games silver medalists for Italy
Mediterranean Games bronze medalists for Italy
Mediterranean Games medalists in athletics
Athletes (track and field) at the 1991 Mediterranean Games
Sportspeople from the Province of Monza e Brianza
20th-century Italian people
21st-century Italian people